Dry Creek School may refer to:

in the United States
Dry Creek School (Manhattan, Montana), listed on the NRHP in Montana
Dry Creek School (Summerville, Oregon), listed on the NRHP in Union County, Oregon